Frederick is a city in and the county seat of Frederick County, Maryland, United States. It is part of the Washington–Baltimore combined statistical area. It is located at an  important crossroads at the intersection of a major north–south Native American trail and east–west routes to the Chesapeake Bay, both at Baltimore and what became Washington, D.C. and across the Appalachian mountains to the Ohio River watershed. It is a part of the Washington-Arlington-Alexandria, DC-VA-MD-WV Metropolitan Statistical Area, which is part of a greater Washington-Baltimore-Arlington, DC-MD-VA-WV-PA Combined Statistical Area. 

Frederick's population was 78,171 people as of the 2020 U.S. census, making it the second-largest incorporated city in Maryland behind Baltimore. Frederick is home to Frederick Municipal Airport (IATA: FDK), which accommodates general aviation, and Fort Detrick, a U.S. Army bioscience and communications research installation and Frederick County's largest employer.

History

Pre-Colonization

Located where Catoctin Mountain (the easternmost ridge of the Blue Ridge mountains) meets the rolling hills of the Piedmont region, the Frederick area became a crossroads even before European explorers and traders arrived. Native American hunters (possibly including the Susquehannocks, the Algonquian-speaking Shawnee, or the Seneca or Tuscarora or other members of the Iroquois Confederation) followed the Monocacy River from the Susquehanna River watershed in Pennsylvania to the Potomac River watershed and the lands of the more agrarian and maritime Algonquian peoples, particularly the Lenape of the Delaware valley or the Piscataway and Powhatan of the lower Potomac watershed and Chesapeake Bay. This became known as the Monocacy Trail or even the Great Indian Warpath, with some travelers continuing southward through the "Great Appalachian Valley" (Shenandoah Valley, etc.) to the western Piedmont in North Carolina, or traveling down other watersheds in Virginia toward the Chesapeake Bay, such as those of the Rappahannock, James and York Rivers.

Colonial era

The earliest European settlement was slightly north of Frederick in Monocacy, Maryland. Monocacy was founded before 1730 (when the Indian trail became a wagon road) and was abandoned before the American Revolutionary War, likely due to the river's periodic flooding, hostilities predating the French and Indian War, or simply Frederick's better location with easier access to the Potomac River near its confluence with the Monocacy.

Daniel Dulany, a land speculator, laid out what was initially called Frederick Town by 1745. Three years earlier, All Saints Church had been founded on a hilltop near a warehouse/trading post. Sources disagree as to which Frederick the town was named for, but the likeliest candidates are Frederick Calvert, 6th Baron Baltimore (one of the proprietors of Maryland), Frederick Louis, Prince of Wales, and Frederick the Great, King of Prussia.

In 1748, Frederick County was formed by carving a section off of Prince George's County. Frederick Town (now Frederick) was made the county seat of Frederick County. The county originally extended to the Appalachian mountains (areas further west being disputed between the colonies of Virginia and Pennsylvania until 1789). The current town's first house was built by a young German Reformed schoolmaster from the Rhineland Palatinate named Johann Thomas Schley (died 1790), who led a party of immigrants (including his wife, Maria Von Winz) to the Maryland colony. The Palatinate settlers bought land from Dulany on the banks of Carroll Creek, and Schley's house stood at the northwest corner of Middle Alley and East Patrick Street into the 20th century. Schley's settlers also founded a German Reformed Church (today known as Evangelical Reformed Church, and part of the UCC). Probably the oldest house still standing in Frederick today is Schifferstadt, built in 1756 by German settler Joseph Brunner and now the Schifferstadt Architectural Museum.

Schley's group was among the many Pennsylvania Dutch (ethnic Germans) (as well as Scots-Irish and French and later Irish) who migrated south and westward in the late-18th century. Frederick was an important stop along the migration route that became known as the Great Wagon Road, which came down from Gettysburg, Pennsylvania and Emmitsburg, Maryland and continued south following the Great Appalachian Valley through Winchester and Roanoke, Virginia. Another important route continued along the Potomac River from near Frederick, to Hagerstown, where it split. One branch crossed the Potomac River near Martinsburg, West Virginia and continued down into the Shenandoah valley. The other continued west to Cumberland, Maryland and ultimately crossed the Appalachian Mountains into the watershed of the Ohio River. Thus, British General Edward Braddock marched his troops (including the youthful George Washington) west in 1755 through Frederick on the way to their fateful ambush near Fort Duquesne (later Fort Pitt, then Pittsburgh) during the French and Indian War. However, the British after the Proclamation of 1763 restricted that westward migration route until after the American Revolutionary War. Other westward migrants continued south from Frederick to Roanoke along the Great Wagon Road, crossing the Appalachians into Kentucky and Tennessee at the Cumberland Gap near the Virginia/North Carolina border.

Other German settlers in Frederick were Evangelical Lutherans, led by Rev. Henry Muhlenberg. They moved their mission church from Monocacy to what became a large complex a few blocks further down Church Street from the Anglicans and the German Reformed Church. Methodist missionary Robert Strawbridge, who accepted an invitation to preach at Frederick town in 1770, and Francis Asbury, who arrived two years later, both helped found a congregation which became Calvary Methodist Church, worshipping in a log building from 1792 (although superseded by larger buildings in 1841, 1865, 1910 and 1930). Frederick also had a Catholic mission, to which Rev. Jean DuBois was assigned in 1792, which became St. John the Evangelist Church (built in 1800).

To control this crossroads during the American Revolution, the British garrisoned a German Hessian regiment in the town;

Early 19th century

As the county seat for Western Maryland, Frederick not only was an important market town but also the seat of justice. Although Montgomery County and Washington County were split off from Frederick County in 1776, Frederick remained the seat of the smaller (though still large) county. Important lawyers who practiced in Frederick included John Hanson, Francis Scott Key and Roger B. Taney.

Frederick was also known during the nineteenth century for its religious pluralism, with one of its main thoroughfares, Church Street, hosting about a half dozen major churches. In 1793, All Saints Church hosted the first confirmation of an American citizen, by the newly consecrated Episcopal Bishop Thomas Claggett. That original colonial building was replaced in 1814 by a brick classical revival structure. It still stands today, although the principal worship space has become an even larger brick gothic church joining it at the back and facing Frederick's City Hall (so the parish remains the oldest Episcopal Church in western Maryland). The main Catholic church, dedicated to St. John the Evangelist, was built in 1800, then rebuilt in 1837 (across the street) one block north of Church Street on East Second Street, where it still stands along with a school and convent established by the Visitation Sisters. The stone Evangelical Lutheran Church of 1752 was also rebuilt and enlarged in 1825, then replaced by the current twin-spired structure in 1852.

The oldest African-American church in the town is Asbury United Methodist Church, founded as the Old Hill Church, a mixed congregation in 1818. It became an African-American congregation in 1864, renamed Asbury Methodist Episcopal Church in 1870, and built its current building on All Saints Street in 1921.

Together, these churches dominated the town, set against the backdrop of the first ridge of the Appalachians at Catoctin Mountain. The abolitionist poet John Greenleaf Whittier later immortalized this view of Frederick in his poem to "Barbara Fritchie": "The clustered spires of Frederick stand/Green-walled by the hills of Maryland."

When U.S. President Thomas Jefferson commissioned National Road from Baltimore toward St. Louis, eventually built to Vandalia, then the state capital of Illinois, National Pike ran through Frederick along Patrick Street; it later became U.S. Route 40. Frederick's Jacob Engelbrecht corresponded with Jefferson in 1824 and received a transcribed psalm from Jefferson in return. Engelbrecht kept a diary from 1819 through 1878, which remains an important first-hand account of 19th century life on  National Road. An important house remaining from this era is the Tyler Spite House, built in 1814 at 112 W. Church Street by a local doctor to prevent the city from extending Record Street south through his land to meet West Patrick Street.

Frederick also became one of the new nation's leading mining counties in the early 19th century. It exported gold, copper, limestone, marble, iron, and other minerals. As early as the American Revolution, Catoctin Furnace near Thurmont became an important source of iron production. Other mining areas split off into Washington County, Maryland and Allegheny County, Maryland but continued to ship their ore through Frederick to Eastern cities and ports.

Frederick had easy access to the Chesapeake and Ohio Canal, which began operations in 1831 and continued hauling freight until 1924. Also in 1831, the Baltimore and Ohio Railroad (B&O) completed its Frederick Branch line from the Frederick (or Monocacy) Junction off the main Western Line from Baltimore to Harpers Ferry, Cumberland, and the Ohio River. The railroad reached Chicago and St. Louis by the 1850s.

Civil War

Frederick became Maryland's capital city briefly in 1861, as the legislature moved from Annapolis to vote on the secession question. President Lincoln arrested several members, and the assembly was unable to convene a quorum to vote on secession.

As a major crossroads, Frederick, like Winchester, Virginia, and Martinsburg, West Virginia, saw considerable action during the American Civil War. Slaves also escaped from or through Frederick (since Maryland was still a "slave state" although it had not seceded) to join the Union forces, work against the Confederacy and seek freedom. During the Maryland campaigns, both Union and Confederate troops marched through the city. Frederick also hosted several hospitals to nurse the wounded from those battles, as is related in the National Museum of Civil War Medicine on East Patrick Street.

A legend related by John Greenleaf Whittier claimed that Frederick's Pennsylvania Dutch women (including Barbara Fritchie who reportedly waved a flag) booed the Confederates in September 1862, as General Stonewall Jackson led his light infantry division through Frederick on his way to the battles of Crampton's, Fox's and Turner's Gaps on South Mountain and Antietam near Sharpsburg. Union Major General Jesse L. Reno's IX Corps followed Jackson's men through the city a few days later on the way to the Battle of South Mountain, where Reno died. The sites of the battles are due west of the city along the National Road, west of Burkittsville. Confederate troops under Jackson and Walker unsuccessfully attempted to halt the Federal army's westward advance into the Cumberland Valley and towards Sharpsburg. Gathland State Park has the War Correspondents' Memorial stone arch erected by reporter/editor George Alfred Townsend (1841–1914). The 1889 memorial commemorating Major General Reno and the Union soldiers of his IX Corps is on Reno Monument Road west of Middletown, just below the summit of Fox's Gap, as is a 1993 memorial to slain Confederate Brig. Gen. Samuel Garland Jr., and the North Carolina troops who held the line.

President Abraham Lincoln, on his way to visit Gen. George McClellan after the Battle of South Mountain and the Battle of Antietam, delivered a short speech at what was then the B. & O. Railroad depot at the current intersection of East All Saints and South Market Streets. A plaque commemorates the speech (at what is today the Frederick Community Action Agency, a Social Services office).

At the Prospect Hall mansion off Jefferson Street to Buckeystown Pike near what is now Butterfly Lane, in the early morning hours of June 28, 1863, a messenger arrived from President Abraham Lincoln and General-in-Chief Henry Halleck, informing General George Meade that he would be replacing General Joseph Hooker after the latter's disastrous performance at Chancellorsville in May. The Army of the Potomac camped around the Prospect Hall property for the several days as skirmishers pursued Lee's Confederate Army of Northern Virginia prior to Gettysburg. A large granite rectangular monument made from one of the boulders at the "Devil's Den" in Gettysburg to the east along the driveway commemorates the midnight change-of-command.

In July 1864, in the third Southern invasion, Confederate troops led by Lieutenant General Jubal Early occupied Frederick and extorted $200,000 ($ in  dollars) from citizens for not razing the city on their way to Washington D.C. Union troops under Major General Lew Wallace fought a successful delaying action, in what became the last significant Confederate advance at the Battle of Monocacy, also known as the "Battle that saved Washington." The Monocacy National Battlefield lies just southeast of the city limits, along the Monocacy River at the B. & O. Railroad junction where two bridges cross the stream - an iron-truss bridge for the railroad and a covered wooden bridge for the Frederick-Urbana-Georgetown Pike, which was the site of the main battle of July 1864. Some skirmishing occurred further northeast of town at the stone-arched "Jug Bridge" where the National Road crossed the Monocacy; and an artillery bombardment occurred along the National Road west of town near Red Man's Hill and Prospect Hall mansion as the Union troops retreated eastward. Antietam National Battlefield and South Mountain State Battlefield Park which commemorates the 1862 battles are located 23 miles and 35 miles respectively to the west-northwest.

The reconstructed home of Barbara Fritchie stands on West Patrick Street, just past Carroll Creek linear park. Fritchie, a significant figure in Maryland history in her own right, is buried in Frederick's Mount Olivet Cemetery. British Prime Minister Winston Churchill quoted Whittier's poem to President Franklin D. Roosevelt when they stopped here in 1941 on a car trip to the presidential retreat, then called "Shangra-La" (now "Camp David") within the Catoctin Mountains near Thurmont.

Late 19th century
Admiral Winfield Scott Schley (1839–1911) was born at "Richfields", the mansion home of his father. He became an important naval commander of the American fleet on board his flagship and heavy cruiser USS Brooklyn along with Admiral William T. Sampson in the Battle of Santiago de Cuba off the shores of the Spanish island colony of Cuba in the Spanish–American War in 1898. Major Henry Schley's son, Dr. Fairfax Schley, was instrumental in setting up the Frederick County Agricultural Society and the Great Frederick Fair. Gilmer Schley served as Mayor from 1919 to 1922, and the Schleys remained one of the town's leading families into the late-20th century.

Nathaniel Wilson Schley, a prominent banker, and his wife Mary Margaret Schley helped organize and raise funds for the annual Great Frederick Fair, one of the two largest agricultural fairs in the State. Since the 1960s, the fair has featured many outstanding country-western singers and become a major music festival. Schley Avenue commemorates the family's role in the city's heritage.

The Frederick and Pennsylvania Line railroad ran from Frederick to the Pennsylvania–Maryland State line, a/k/a Mason–Dixon line. Chartered in 1867, construction began in 1869 and the line opened October 8, 1872. However, it defaulted on its interest payments in 1874 and acquired by the Pennsylvania Railroad in 1875, which formed a new division to operate the rail line. In the spring of 1896, the Frederick and Pennsylvania Line railroad was liquidated in a judicial sale to the Pennsylvania Railroad for $150,000. The railroad survived through mergers and the Penn-Central bankruptcy. However, the State of Maryland acquired the Frederick and Pennsylvania Line in 1982. As of 2013, all but two miles at the southern terminus at Frederick still exist, operated by either the Walkersville Southern, or the Maryland Midland Railway (MMID) railroads.

Jewish pioneers Henry Lazarus and Levy Cohan settled in Frederick in the 1740s as merchants. Mostly German Jewish immigrants organized a community in the mid-19th century, creating the Frederick Hebrew Congregation in 1858. Later the congregation lapsed, but was reorganized in 1917 as a cooperative effort between the older settlers and more recently arrived Eastern European Jews under the name Beth Sholom Congregation.

In 1905, Rev. E. B. Hatcher started the First Baptist Church of Frederick.

After the Civil War, the Maryland legislature established racially segregated public facilities by the end of the 19th century, re-imposing white supremacy. Black institutions were typically underfunded in the state, and it was not until 1921 that Frederick established a public high school for African Americans. First located at 170 West All Saints Street, it moved to 250 Madison Street, where it eventually was adapted as South Frederick Elementary. The building presently houses the Lincoln Elementary School. The Laboring Sons Memorial Grounds, a cemetery for free blacks, was founded in 1851.

Geography

Frederick is located in Frederick County in the northern part of the state of Maryland. The city has served as a major crossroads since colonial times. Today it is located at the junction of Interstate 70, Interstate 270, U.S. Route 340, U.S. Route 40, U.S. Route 40 Alternate and U.S. Route 15 (which runs north–south). The city's coordinates are 39°25'35" North, 77°25'13" West (39.426294, −77.420403).

The city's area is predominantly land, with small areas of water being the Monocacy River, which runs to the east of the city, Carroll Creek (which runs through the city and causes periodic floods, such as that during the summer of 1972 and fall of 1976), as well as several neighborhood ponds and small city owned lakes, such as Culler Lake, a man-made small body of water in the downtown area.

Climate
The climate in this area is characterized by hot, humid summers and generally cool winters. It lies to the west of the fall line, which gives the city slightly lower temperatures compared to locales further east. According to the Köppen Climate Classification system, Frederick has a humid subtropical climate, abbreviated Cfa on climate maps.

Demographics

2010 census
As of the 2010 U.S. census, there were 65,239 people residing in Frederick city and roughly 27,000 households. The city's population grew by 23.6% in the ten years since the 2000 census, making it the fastest growing incorporated area in the state of Maryland with a population of over 50,000 for 2010.

2010 census data put the racial makeup of the city at 61% White, 18.6% Black or African American, 0.2% Native American, 5.8% Asian American, and 14.4% Hispanic or Latino of any race. Roughly 4% of the city's population was of two or more races.

In regard to minority group growth, the 2010 census data show the city's Hispanic population at 9,402, a 271 percent increase compared with 2,533 in 2000, making Hispanics/Latinos the fastest growing race group in the city and in Frederick county (267 percent increase). Frederick city had 3,800 Asian residents in 2010, a 128 percent increase from the city's 1,664 Asian residents in 2000. The city's black or African-American population increased 56 percent, from 7,777 in 2000 to 12,144 in 2010.

For the roughly 27,000 households in the city, 30.6% had children under the age of 18 living with them, 41.7% were married couples living together, 12.8% had a female householder with no husband present, and 41% were non-families. Approximately 31% of all households were made up of individuals living alone and 8.1% had someone living alone who was 65 years of age or older. The average household size was 2.46 and the average family size was 3.11.

Government

City executive
In 2017, Democrat Michael O'Connor was elected mayor of Frederick.

Previous mayors include:

Lawrence Brengle (1817)
Hy Kuhn (1818–1820)
George Baer Jr. (1820–1823)
John L. Harding (1823–1826)
George Kolb (1826–1829)
Thomas Carlton (1829–1835)
Daniel Kolb (1835–1838)
Michael Baltzell (1838–1841)
George Hoskins (1841–1847)
M. E. Bartgis (1847–1849)
James Bartgis (1849–1856)
Lewis Brunner (1856–1859)
W. G. Cole (1859–1865)
J. Engelbrecht (1865–1868)
Valerius Ebert (1868–1871)
Thomas M. Holbruner (1871–1874)
Lewis M. Moberly (1874–1883)
Hiram Bartgis (1883–1889)
Lewis H. Doll (1889–1890)
Lewis Brunner (1890–1892)
John E. Fleming (1892–1895)
Aquilla R. Yeakle (1895–1898)
William F. Chilton (1898–1901)
George Edward Smith (1901–1910)
John Edward Schell (1910–1913)
Lewis H. Fraley (1913–1919)
Gilmer Schley (1919–1922)
Lloyd C. Culler (1922–1931)
Elmer F. Munshower (1931–1934)
Lloyd C. Culler (1934–1943)
Hugh V. Gittinger (1943–1946)
Lloyd C. Culler (1946–1950)
Elmer F. Munshower (1950–1951)
Donald B. Rice (1951–1954)
John A. Derr (1954–1958)
Jacob R. Ramsburg (1958–1962)
E. Paul Magaha (1962–1966)
John A. Derr (1966–1970)
E. Paul Magaha (1970–1974)
Ronald N. Young (1974–1990)
Paul P. Gordon (1990–1994)
James S. Grimes (1994–2002)
Jennifer Dougherty (2002–2005)
W. Jeff Holtzinger (2005–2009)
Randy McClement (2009–2017)
Michael O'Connor (2017-)

Recent mayoral elections

Representative body
Frederick has a board of aldermen of six members (one of whom is the mayor) that serves as its legislative body. Elections are held every four years. Following the elections on November 2, 2021, Kelly Russell, Donna Kuzemchak, Derek Shackelford, Katie Nash, and Ben MacShane, all Democrats, were elected to the board. Democrat Michael O'Connor was re-elected mayor.

Police
The city has its own police department.

Economy
Frederick's relative proximity to Washington, D.C., has always been an important factor in the development of its local economy, along with the presence of Fort Detrick, its largest employer.
Frederick is the home of Riverside Research Park, a large biomedical research park located on Frederick's east side. Tenants include the relocated main offices of the National Cancer Institute's Frederick National Laboratory for Cancer Research as well as Charles River Labs. As a result of continued and enhanced federal government investment, the Frederick area will likely maintain a continued growth pattern over the next decade. Frederick has also been impacted by recent national trends centered on the gentrification of the downtown areas of cities across the nation (particularly in the northeast and mid-Atlantic), and to re-brand them as sites for cultural consumption.

The Frederick Historic District in the city's downtown houses more than 200 retailers, restaurants and antique shops along Market, Patrick and East Streets. Restaurants feature a diverse array of cuisines, including Italian American, Thai, Vietnamese, and Cuban, as well as a number of regionally recognized dining establishments, such as The Tasting Room and Olde Towne Tavern.

In addition to retail and dining, downtown Frederick is home to 600 businesses and organizations totaling nearly 5,000 employees. A growing technology sector can be found in downtown's historic renovated spaces, as well as in new office buildings located along Carroll Creek Park.

Carroll Creek Park began as a flood control project in the late 1970s. It was an effort to reduce the risk to downtown Frederick from the 100-year floodplain and restore economic vitality to the historic commercial district. Today, more than $150 million in private investing is underway or planned in new construction, infill development or historic renovation in the park area.

The first phase of the park improvements, totaling nearly $11 million in construction, run from Court Street to just past Carroll Street. New elements to the park include brick pedestrian paths, water features, planters with shade trees and plantings, pedestrian bridges and a 350-seat amphitheater for outdoor performances.

A recreational and cultural resource, the park also serves as an economic development catalyst, with private investment along the creek functioning as a key component to the park's success. More than 400,000 sf of office space; 150,000 sf of commercial/retail space; nearly 300 residential units; and more than 2,000 parking spaces are planned or under construction.

On the first Saturday of every month, Frederick hosts an evening event in the downtown area called "First Saturday". Each Saturday has a theme, and activities are planned according to those themes in the downtown area (particularly around the Carroll Creek Promenade). The event spans a ten-block area of Frederick and takes place from 5 p.m. to 9 p.m. During the late spring, summer, and early fall months, this event draws particularly large crowds from neighboring cities and towns in Maryland, and nearby locations in the tri-state area (Virginia and Pennsylvania). The average number of attendees visiting downtown Frederick during first Saturday events is around 11,000, with higher numbers from May to October.

Top employers
According to the county's comprehensive annual financial reports, the top employers by number of employees in the county are the following. ("NR" indicates the employer was not ranked among the top ten employers that year.)

Culture

Cityscape

Frederick is well known for the "clustered spires" skyline of its historic downtown churches. These spires are depicted on the city's seal and many other city-affiliated logos and insignia. The phrase "clustered spires" is used as the name of several city locations such as Clustered Spires Cemetery and the city-operated Clustered Spires Golf Course. 

The scale of the older part of the city is dense, with streets and sidewalks suitable for pedestrians, and a variety of shops and restaurants, comprising what Forbes magazine in 2010 called one of the United States' "Greatest Neighborhoods".

Frederick has a bridge painted with a mural titled Community Bridge. The artist William Cochran has been acclaimed for the trompe-l'œil realism of the mural. Thousands of people sent ideas representing "community", which he painted on the stonework of the bridge. The residents of Frederick call it "the mural", "painted bridge", or more commonly, the "mural bridge".

Arts
The Frederick Arts Council is the designated arts organization for Frederick County. The organization is charged with promoting, supporting, and advocating the arts. There are over ten art galleries in downtown Frederick, and three theaters are located within 50 feet of each other (Cultural Arts Center, Weinberg Center for the Arts, and the Maryland Ensemble Theatre). Frederick is the home of The Delaplaine Visual Arts Education Center, a leading non-profit in the region, as well as the Maryland Shakespeare Festival.

In August 2007, the streets of Frederick were adorned with 30 life-size fiberglass keys as part of a major public art project entitled "The Keys to Frederick". In October 2007, artist William Cochran created a large-scale glass project titled The Dreaming. The project is in the historic theater district, across from the Wienberg Center for the Arts.

The film Blair Witch Project (1999) was set in the woods west of Burkittsville, Maryland, in western Frederick County, but it was not filmed there.

Theater
The Maryland Ensemble Theatre (MET), a professional theater company, is housed on the lower level of the Francis Scott Key Hotel. The MET first produced mainstage theater in 1997, but the group began performing together with its creation of The Comedy Pigs sketch comedy/improv troupe in April 1993. The students at Hood College also have a theatre club and put on shows at least once during the school year, sometimes two shows are presented during the school year.

Music

Frederick has a community orchestra, the Frederick Symphony Orchestra, that performs five concerts per year consisting of classical masterpieces. Other musical organizations in Frederick include the Frederick Chorale, the Choral Arts Society of Frederick, the Frederick Regional Youth Orchestra, and the Frederick Symphonic Band. The Frederick Children's Chorus has performed since 1985. It is a five-tier chorus, with approximately 150 members ranging in age from 5 to 18.

A weekly recital is played on the Joseph Dill Baker Carillon every Sunday, year 'round, at 12:30 p.m. for half an hour. The carillon can be heard from anywhere in Baker Park, and the city carillonneur can be seen playing in the tower once a year as part of the Candlelight tour of Historic Houses of Worship, on the first weekday after Christmas.

Frederick is home to the Frederick School of Classical Ballet, the official school for Maryland Regional Ballet. Approximately 30 dance studios are located around the city. Each year, these studios perform at the annual DanceFest event.
Frederick also has a large amphitheater in Baker Park, which features regular music performances of local and national acts, particularly in the summer months.

Clutch, a successful rock band formed in 1990, calls Frederick their home. The band rehearses for each album and tour in Frederick while drummer Jean-Paul Gaster has been a resident of Frederick since 2001. One of the band's biggest hits, "50,000 Unstoppable Watts", was written about Fort Detrick and Frederick.

Frederick is also home to indie-rock band Silent Old Mtns. The music video for their 2012 single Dead All The Time was shot entirely in Historic Downtown Frederick.

Retail
The city's main mall is the Francis Scott Key Mall. An abandoned retail center, the Frederick Towne Mall existed previously, and closed in 2013. There are plans for the Frederick Towne Mall, now known as District 40 to include a movie theatre and new shopping options as construction begins in 2020.

Religion
There are numerous religious denominations in Frederick: the first churches were established by early Protestant settlers, followed by Irish Catholics and other European Catholics.

St. Paul African Methodist Episcopal Church in Della (now Urbana) is one of the oldest active African-American churches in Frederick County, Maryland, according to a testimonial placed in its cornerstone which stated that it was the first A.M.E. church built in the southern part of Frederick County. It was built in 1916 on a foundation first laid in 1908.

Other denominations represented in Frederick City and in the surrounding county include large numbers of Brethren, as well as some Pentecostal churches. Quinn Chapel, of the African Methodist Episcopal (A.M.E.) Church, is located on East Third Street. The AME Church, founded in Philadelphia in the early 19th century by free blacks, is the first black independent denomination in the United States. The Church of Jesus Christ of Latter-day Saints (LDS Church) has had a presence in Frederick since the 1970s when the first congregation was organized and now includes four congregations in two buildings within the city.

Beth Sholom Congregation, a conservative synagogue, has been in Frederick since 1917. Congregation Kol Ami, a Reform synagogue, was founded in 2003. Chabad Lubavitch of Fredrick , a Chabad, was founded in 2009.

Sri Bhaktha Anjaneya Temple, located in Urbana, serves Frederick's Hindu community.

The Islamic Society of Frederick, founded in the early 1990s, serves Frederick's Muslim community.

Media

Television
Frederick is licensed one Maryland Public Television station affiliate: WFPT 62 (PBS/MPT).

Radio
The city is home to WWFD/820 (the former WZYQ/1370) and 94.3 FM, relaying free-form The Gamut; WFMD/930AM broadcasting a news/talk/sports format; WFRE/99.9 broadcasting Country Music; and WAFY/103.1 which plays all the latest pop songs. The following box details all of the radio stations in the local market.

Print
Frederick's newspaper of record is the Frederick News-Post.

Sports

 Frederick Keys, a collegiate summer baseball team that was formerly a minor league baseball team associated with the Baltimore Orioles (1989–2020). The Keys are named after Francis Scott Key, who was a resident of Frederick. They play at Nymeo Field at Harry Grove Stadium.
FC Frederick, a semi-pro team in the National Premier Soccer League. The club plays home games at Thomas Athletic Field at Hood College.
 In April 2023, a yet to be named unaffiliated minor league baseball team in the Atlantic League of Professional Baseball will begin playing at Nymeo Field at Harry Grove Stadium.

Education

Library
The main library for Frederick County is located in downtown Frederick, with several branches across the county.

Public schools
Frederick County Public Schools (FCPS) operates area public schools.

FCPS ranks number one in the state of Maryland in the 2012 School Progress Index accountability data, which includes overall student performance, closing achievement gaps, student growth and college and career readiness. FCPS holds the second-lowest dropout rate in the state of Maryland at 3.84%, with a graduation rate at 93.31%. In 2013, FCPS's SAT average combined mean score was 1538, which is 55 points higher than Maryland's combined average of 1483 and 40 points higher than the nation's average of 1498. All of FCPS's high schools, except for Oakdale High School, which was not open to all grade levels at the time of the survey, are ranked in the top 10% of the nation for encouraging students to take AP classes.

High schools serving Frederick students include:

Frederick High School
Governor Thomas Johnson High School
Tuscarora High School
Oakdale High School

Other high schools in Frederick County:
Middletown High School
Catoctin High School
Brunswick High School
Linganore High School
Urbana High School
Walkersville High School

Other public schools: Adult Education, Career and Technology Center, Heather Ridge School, Outdoor School, Rock Creek School, and The Earth and Space Science Laboratory. Frederick County was long-time home to a highly innovative outdoor school for all sixth graders in Frederick County. This school was located at Camp Greentop, near the presidential retreat at Camp David and Cunningham Falls State Park.

Public Charter K-8 schools
Frederick Classical Charter School

Private K–8 schools
The Banner School
St. John Regional Catholic School
Frederick Adventist Academy
Trinity School of Frederick, a joint Episcopal-Lutheran school (closed 2017)
Visitation Academy of Frederick (closed 2016)

K–12 schools
Maryland School for the Deaf
Friends Meeting School

Private high schools
Saint John's Catholic Prep
New Life Christian School
Frederick Christian Academy

Colleges and universities
 Frederick Community College
 Hood College
 Mount St. Mary's University, Frederick County, Maryland

Transportation

Frederick's location as a crossroads has been a factor in its development as a minor distribution center both for the movement of people in Western Maryland, as well as goods. This intersection has created an efficient distribution network for commercial traffic in and out, as well as through the city.

Major roads and streets in Frederick are intersected by: 
I-70: A major east–west interstate highway connecting Frederick to Baltimore and Hagerstown
I-270 Dwight D. Eisenhower Memorial Highway: Begins at I-70, and spurs southeastward towards Washington, D.C.
U.S. 15 Frederick Freeway: Travels north to Gettysburg, PA and south concurrent with U.S. 340 to Point of Rocks, Maryland and Leesburg, Virginia.
U.S. 40: Runs concurrent with I-70 and U.S. 15 North until becoming West Patrick Street and Old National Pike to Middletown.
U.S. 340: Runs southwestward with U.S. 15 until spurring west towards Harpers Ferry, West Virginia.

From 1896 to 1961, Frederick was served by the Hagerstown & Frederick Railway, an interurban trolley service that was among the last surviving systems of its kind in the United States.

The city is served by MARC commuter rail service, which operates several trains daily on the former Baltimore and Ohio Railroad's Old Main Line and Metropolitan Branch subdivisions to Washington, D.C.; Express bus route 991, which operates to the Shady Grove Metrorail Station, and a series of buses operated by TransIT services of Frederick, Maryland. Greyhound Lines also serves the city.

Frederick Municipal Airport has a mile-long runway and a second 3600' runway.

Beginning in the 1990s, Frederick has invested in several urban infrastructure projects, including streetscape, new bus routes, as well as multi-use paths. A circular road, Monocacy Boulevard, is an important component to the revitalization of its historic core.

The Mayor's Ad-hoc Bicycle Committee was formed in 2010 and given the mission to achieve designation for the City as a Bicycle Friendly Community (BFC) by the League of American Bicyclists. The first application resulted in an Honorable Mention. Upon reapplication In 2012, Frederick achieved the bronze level BFC designation. The City's third application resulted in re-certification as a Bronze Bicycle Friendly Community. Work is ongoing to achieve an even stronger designation (Silver) at the time of the next application.

In 2013, the Mayor's Ad-hoc Bicycle Committee was expanded in scope to include pedestrian issues and was formally adopted by Resolution 13-08 as a permanent standing committee called the Bicycle and Pedestrian Advisory Committee (BPAC). The BPAC advises City officials and staff on the sound development, management, and safe use of The City of Frederick's pedestrian and bicycle systems as they relate to infrastructure, accessibility, and promoting the benefits of these systems.

Notable people

 Joe Alexander (1986), American-Israeli named to the 2007 All-Big East squad; also an All-American Honorable Mention (studied at Linganore High School).
 Scott Ambush, musician (born in Frederick, Maryland).
 Michael Beasley (1989), NCAA National Player of the Year (2007–2008), 2nd overall pick of the 2008 NBA Draft by Miami Heat (born in Cheverly, Maryland, lived in Frederick, Maryland for one year).
 Shadrach Bond (1773–1832), the first Governor of Illinois (born in Frederick).
 Lester Bowie (1941–1999), jazz trumpeter and improviser; born in the historically black hamlet of Bartonsville, where he is buried
 Joe Bussard (1936-2022), a record collector who helped preserve and celebrate early American blues, country, gospel, and folk music.
 Beverly Byron, Congresswoman who resided in Frederick during her time in office.
 Fred Carter (born 1945), basketball player from Mount St. Mary's University; he starred there in the 1960s, played eight years in the NBA, and was the coach of the Philadelphia 76ers for two seasons
 Patsy Cline (born Virginia Patterson Hensley) (1932–1963), country music singer; she married Gerald Cline of Frederick, and lived in town from 1953 to 1957.
 David Essig, singer-songwriter, performer and record producer (born in Frederick, Maryland in United States of America, currently based in Canada).
Eva Fabian (born 1993), American-Israeli world champion swimmer (born in Frederick, Maryland).
 Chuck Foreman (born October 26, 1950), NFL running back (born in Frederick).
 Charles Andrew Williams (born February 8, 1986), perpetrator of the Santana High School shooting.
 Barbara Fritchie, American Unionist patriot during Civil War (1766–1862).
 David Gallaher (born June 5, 1975), writer whose second book, Yours Truly, Johnny Dollar, is set in 1950s Frederick; an alumnus of Hood College.
 Jessie Graff, record-setting female competitor on American Ninja Warrior (born in New York City, New York, graduated from Urbana High School in Frederick, Maryland in 2002).
 John Hanson, the first President of Congress under the Articles of Confederation
 Shawn Hatosy (born December 29, 1975), actor
 Sam Hinds, MLB player for the Milwaukee Brewers.
 Bruce Ivins (1946–2008), scientist at Fort Detrick suspected of responsibility for the 2001 Anthrax Attacks
 Bradley Tyler Johnson (1829–1903), soldier, lawyer, and politician
 Thomas Johnson (1732–1819), jurist and political figure of the revolutionary and post-revolutionary period; in his later years he lived with his daughter Ann and her husband at Rose Hill Manor in Frederick; Governor Thomas Johnson High School, located on the property, bears his name; a middle school is also named after the governor
 Charlie Keller: Charles Ernest (Charlie) Keller (September 12, 1916 – May 23, 1990) "Charlie King Kong Keller". MLB Player with the New York Yankees and Detroit Tigers; born in Middletown, Maryland; died at his farm near Frederick.
 Francis Scott Key (1779–1843), lawyer, author of "The Star-Spangled Banner"; buried at Mount Olivet Cemetery in Frederick; his memorial and family plot is facing the main entrance of the cemetery.
 Jacob Koogle (1841–1915), Medal of Honor recipient during the American Civil War
 Alex Lowe (1958–1999), Alpinist considered to be the greatest alpine climber and skier of his generation, a pioneer in alpine mountaineering and hero of mountain rescues
 Charles Mathias (1922–2010), a Republican member of the United States Senate, representing Maryland from 1969 to 1987
 Claire McCardell (1905–1958), American fashion designer
 James E. McClellan (1926-2016), American veterinarian and politician
 John McElroy, S.J. (1782–1877), one of two of the Army's first Catholic chaplains. Founder of Boston College.
Derrick Miller, US Army Sergeant sentenced to life in prison for premeditated murder of Afghan civilian during battlefield interrogation; granted parole and released after 8 years. 
 Terence Morris (born January 11, 1979) professional NBA and Israel Basketball Premier League basketball player; attended Gov. Thomas Johnson High School, class of 1997
 John Nelson, U.S. Attorney General, (1843–1845), U.S. Congressman for Maryland's 4th District, (1821–1823); born in Frederick in 1791
 Bazabeel Norman, black Revolutionary War soldier, later to become the second free black landowner in Ohio.
Alexander Ogle (1766-1832), U.S. Congressman
 William Tyler Page (1868 – October 19, 1942), known for his authorship of the American's Creed
 Donald B. Rice (born June 4, 1939), served as Secretary of the Air Force from 1989-1993 for President George H. W. Bush
 Florence Roberts (March 16, 1861 – June 6, 1940), actress of the stage and in motion pictures; roles include Mother Widow Peep in Babes in Toyland
 Richard P. Ross Jr. (March 18, 1906 - October 6, 1990), decorated brigadier general in the Marine Corps during World War II
 Winfield Scott Schley (October 9, 1839 – October 2, 1911), rear admiral of the United States Navy who served from the Civil War to the Spanish–American War, was born in Richfields, near Frederick
 Bobby Steggert (born March 2, 1981) Tony Award-nominated actor.
 Roger Brooke Taney (1777–1864) Chief Justice of the United States Supreme Court (1836–1864); rendered the Dred Scott Decision in 1857; lived and worked in Frederick for several years before his appointment, and is buried there
 Theophilus Thompson (1855 after 1873), the first notable African-American chess player, he wrote the book of endgame positions, Chess Problems: Either to Play and Mate (1873)
 Florence Trail, educator, writer
 Bryan Voltaggio, chef at Volt in Frederick, runner-up on Top Chef television program
 Mark Burrier, Cartoonist and Illustrator

See also

 USS Frederick, 2 ships

References

External links

 Official city government website

 
1745 establishments in Maryland
Cities in Frederick County, Maryland
Cities in the Baltimore–Washington metropolitan area
County seats in Maryland
Monocacy River
Palatine German settlement in Maryland
Pennsylvania Dutch culture in Maryland
Populated places established in 1745
Washington metropolitan area